Sanghamitta Balika Vidyalaya (also called: Sanghamitta Girls' College) is a Buddhist girls' school in Galle, Sri Lanka. It is a national school, which provides primary and secondary education. The school was established in 1919, as the first Buddhist Girls School in Southern province of Sri Lanka. Francis Amarasiri Wickramasinghe Muhandiram was the founder of Sanghamitta Balika Vidyalaya. Today it is a leading girls school in Southern Sri Lanka and accommodates over 5800 students.

External links 
Official Website of Sanghamitta Balika Vidyalaya

National schools in Sri Lanka
Buddhist schools in Sri Lanka
Girls' schools in Sri Lanka
Educational institutions established in 1919
Schools in Galle
1919 establishments in Ceylon